The LFF Lao Ford Cup is the premier football cup competition in Laos.

Champions
2014 : Lao Police Club
2019 : Lao Toyota FC
2020 : Young Elephants
2021 : None
2022 : Young Elephants

See also
 2022 Lao League 1
 2022 Lao League 2
 2022 LFF National Championship

References

 

Football competitions in Laos